Tamil Nadu is the tenth largest state in India and covers an area of . It is bordered by Kerala to the west, Karnataka to the northwest, Andhra Pradesh to the north, the Bay of Bengal to the east and the Indian Ocean to the south. Cape Comorin (Kanyakumari), the southernmost tip of the Indian Peninsula which is the meeting point of the Arabian Sea, the Bay of Bengal, and the Indian Ocean is located in Tamil Nadu.

Terrain
The western, southern and north-western parts are hilly and mix of vegetation and arid. Tamil Nadu is the only state in India that has both the Western Ghat and the Eastern Ghat mountain ranges which both meet at the Nilgiri Hills. The Western Ghats dominate the entire western border with Kerala, effectively blocking much of the rain-bearing clouds of the South West Monsoon from entering the state. The eastern parts are fertile coastal plains. The northern parts are a mix of hills and plains. The central and the south-central regions are arid plains.

Natural hazards
Tamil Nadu falls mostly in a region of low seismic hazard with the exception of the western border areas that lie in a low to moderate hazard zone. Parts of this region have seismic activity  bagging the M5.0 range.

Climate
Tamil Nadu is heavily dependent on monsoon rains, and thereby is prone to droughts when the monsoons fail. The climate of the state ranges from wet rainforests to semi-arid. Tamil Nadu agriculture is a gambling of monsoon. The state has distinct periods of rainfall, which are the advancing monsoon period, South-west monsoon (from June to September) with strong southwest winds, the North-east monsoon (from October to December), with dominant northeast winds, and the Dry season (from January to May). Since the state is entirely dependent on rains for recharging its water resources, monsoon failures lead to acute water scarcity and severe drought.

See also
 Droogs (rocks)

References